Bilasipara College, Old name -"N.N College" Bilasipara in Dhubri district of Assam, was established in 1960 with the objective of imparting higher education to the young people of the rural and economically backward western Assam. It is the second oldest college in Dhubri district. It is now under Deficit Grant-in-Aid system of the government of Assam. At present 16 departments are operating with a staff strength of only 77. It is affiliated to Gauhati University, Guwahati and recognized by University Grants Commission under 2f and 12B. The NAAC accredited the college with a B grade in 2014.

Campus 
The remaining land is being developed. There are newly Girls hostel facilities. A few basic facilities in the field of games and sports are available. There is a yoga center and a temporary canteen on the college premises.

 Lt. Nipendra Narayn Choudhuri ...

Management 
The college is governed by the governing body constituted under Assam non-government college management rule 2000 as amended in 2001 with the principal as its ex-officio secretary. The principal with the cooperation of the vice principal/heads of department/teachers manages the academic and administrative affairs of the college. All the faculty appointments are made strictly according to Assam government rules and UGC guidelines. The students are enrolled on the basis of merit. Currently around 900 students are in undergraduate courses. The college maintains good number of teaching days; in 2003–2004 it was 179.

Departments

Arts
 Assamese
 Bengali 
Economics 
Education
 English 
History
Mathematics
Political Science
Philosophy

Science 
Physics
Chemistry
Mathematics
Zoology
Botany

Library 
The college library possesses 11,482 books with some rare valuable collections and has a well-furnished reading room. The working hours of the library are from 10 am to 4 pm IST. There is no central computer facility in the college, but in the library, there are some computer facilities.

References

External links
 Official website

Educational institutions established in 1960
Universities and colleges in Assam
Dhubri
1960 establishments in Assam
Colleges affiliated to Gauhati University